Zdenka Kabátová-Táborská (born June 3, 1933) is a Czech painter, printmaker, and illustrator.

A native of Prague, Kabátová-Táborská graduated from the State Graphic School in 1952. In 1959 she graduated from the Hochschule für Grafik und Buchkunst Leipzig. She has worked with numerous magazines and publishers over her career, and her work has appeared in exhibitions both at home and abroad. Two prints by Kabátová-Táborská are in the collection of the National Gallery of Art.

References

1933 births
Living people
Czech printmakers
Women printmakers
Czech illustrators
Czech women illustrators
20th-century Czech painters
21st-century painters
20th-century Czech printmakers
21st-century printmakers
20th-century Czech women artists
21st-century Czech women artists
Academy of Fine Arts, Prague alumni
Artists from Prague
Hochschule für Grafik und Buchkunst Leipzig alumni